Philodoria hauicola, the hau leaf miner, is a moth of the family Gracillariidae. It was first described by Otto Herman Swezey in 1910. It is endemic to the Hawaiian islands of Kauai, Oahu, Maui and Hawaii.

The larvae feed on Hibiscus tiliaceus. They mine the leaves of their host plant. As many as 60 mines can be found in a single large leaf. The larva emerges from the mine to form an oval, white cocoon, usually on the upper leaf surface, but it may also be formed on nearby objects.

External links

Philodoria
Leaf miners
Endemic moths of Hawaii